This is a list of video games compatible with Logitech's GT Force, Driving Force, Driving Force Pro, Driving Force GT, G29, G923, G25, G27, Logitech Momo Racing, Logitech Speed Force Force Feedback Wheel for Gamecube and Logitech Wii Speed Force Wireless Wheel.

Compatible games

Yes* : works without H-pattern shifter.

Note : G25 has a sequential gear shift option that makes it more compatible so this chart is inaccurate for the G27 which does not have that feature. Both G25 and G27 have H-pattern shifter, but only the G25 allows for sequential shift.

Note : G29 has new software and a lot of games do not support this wheel or is partly compatible.

Note : Only G29 works with PS4, other wheels needs additional adapters.

Note : MOMO Racing was advertised as a PC wheel and it isn't compatible with some games on PS2. eg. PS2 era Gran Turismo series and Initial D: Special Stage don't recognize the wheel when plugged in.

Note : None of the EA games on Steam work with the G29. It's most likely because the Origin launcher takes priority over the Steam launcher, so the Steam community steering wheel schemes aren't being read by the games. Test it yourself, you have 1 hour to try and get the wheel to work before you can request for a full refund.

References

External links
Official compatibility list (archived)
Official Gamecube compatibility list (archived)

Logitech Racing Wheels
Racing Wheels compatible games